"Black and White America" is a song recorded by American singer Lenny Kravitz and released on September 19, 2011, as the fourth single from his album Black and White America.

Background
Kravitz explained that the song name refers to "the insults endured by his interracial parents in the 1960s, making race the central theme of the album. Despite big ideas, he deftly keeps the mood shifting."

Reception
Ryan Reed of Paste stated, "Many moments rank high on the Kravitz funkiness chart, including the fantastic title track—which rides liquidy slap-bass and buzzing synth, fleshed out by interjections from glistening strings and horns."

Charts

References

Lenny Kravitz songs
2011 songs
Songs written by Lenny Kravitz
Songs written by Craig Ross